South-eastern English football clubs Luton Town and Watford have been rivals since their respective formations in the late 19th century. The clubs are respectively from Luton, Bedfordshire, and Watford, Hertfordshire, and for this reason a match between the two teams is sometimes called a " Derby". Another name occasionally used in the press is "M1 Derby", which comes from the M1 motorway, which passes both towns.

The clubs were both founded during the 1880s (Watford in 1881 and Luton Town in 1885), with the first recorded game between them on 5 December 1885, when Watford Rovers beat Luton Town 1–0 in a friendly match at Vicarage Meadow. The two clubs met competitively for the first time in the Third Round Qualifying of the 1898–99 FA Cup on 29 October 1898 at Dunstable Road. This resulted in a 2–2 draw, with Luton Town winning the replay at Cassio Road on 2 November 1898, 1–0. Since then, there have been 119 competitive Beds–Herts Derbies. Luton Town hold the superior record in these matches, with 54 victories to Watford's 37; there have been 29 draws. The most decisive result in a Luton Town–Watford game was Luton Town's 5–0 victory at Kenilworth Road in January 1926. There have been three incidences of 4–0, two won by Watford; in September 1929, Luton Town beat Watford 4–0 at Vicarage Road, in October 1997, Watford beat Luton Town 4–0 at Kenilworth Road, and 25 years later, Watford won 4-0 in October 2022 at Vicarage Road.

Watford and Luton Town played each other regularly in the Southern League and, following the formation of Third Division South in season 1920–21, played every season until 1936–37, when Luton Town won promotion to Division Two. This and the Second World War separated the teams from league competition until 1963–64 when they met again, this time in Division Three. The animosity between the clubs, both players and fans, intensified during the late 1960s and the 1970s, and reached a peak during the 1980s, when both teams played in the top-flight First Division. Watford were relegated at the end of the 1987–88 season, while Luton Town followed four years later. The clubs played against each other regularly in the league for six seasons during the 1990s, in the second and third tiers of English football.

Since the 1997–98 season, at the end of which Watford won promotion, the teams have not met regularly, as Watford have played in higher divisions than Luton Town for 21 of the last 23 seasons, including when Luton Town was relegated to non-league football. In the last sixteen seasons there have been only four league meetings between the two teams, played during the 2005–06, the 2020–21 and the 2022-23 season. All four meetings have taken place in the Football League Championship, English football's second level. During the 2005–06 season, Watford won 2–1 at Kenilworth Road and drew 1–1 at Vicarage Road at the end of that season Watford once again won promotion. During the 2020–21 season Watford won 1–0 at Vicarage Road on 26 September 2020. Luton Town won the reverse fixture 1–0 at Kenilworth Road on 17 April 2021. So the spoils for the season were shared; but with Watford's promotion back to the Premier League for season 2021–22 confirmed just days later, the rivalry was once again put on hold. However, with Watford relegated from the Premier League back to the 2022–23 EFL Championship the team met on 23 October 2022, with Watford easily winning 4-0 at Vicarage Road.

History

Origins

The first match between the two clubs can be dated as 5 December 1885, as Watford Rovers hosted Luton Town in a friendly. Watford beat Luton 1–0 at Vicarage Meadow in the inaugural match. The first match at Luton's Dallow Lane came on 20 March 1886 – Watford won 3–0. Luton's first success in the fixture came at Vicarage Meadow on 16 October of the same year, where they emerged as 4–1 winners. Two friendlies between Luton Town and West Herts, as Watford Rovers were now more commonly known, took place during the 1891–92 season; West Herts won 4–3 at Luton and the match at West Herts was a draw. Five more friendly matches were played over the next three seasons, all Luton victories.

In the 1930s a Vauxhall plant was speculated to be built in Watford, however due to the popularity of the Luton Body van at the time it was subsequently decided to have the plant built in Luton.

The Southern League

Luton Town did not join a league until 1894–95, when they joined the Southern League. West Herts also joined the Southern League two years later. However, as Luton Town had left the league the same year, a league meeting did not occur. The first competitive meeting of the two clubs came on 29 October 1898, as Luton drew Watford in the 1898–99 FA Cup third qualifying round. The second meeting came soon after, as the 2–2 draw at Luton meant that a replay was needed – Luton ran out 1–0 victors at Watford. The next season saw Luton drawn against Watford again, and this time Luton needed only one attempt to beat Watford 3–2.

Luton rejoined the Southern League in 1900, and the fixture then became a regular one in the Southern League calendar. Save for the 1903–04, 1912–13 and 1913–14 seasons that the clubs spent in different divisions, two matches were played each year. Luton's was the superior record, as they won 13 Southern League meetings to Watford's eight. 1920–21 saw both clubs made members of the Football League when the Southern League First Division was incorporated as the Football League Third Division.

The Football League
Matches occurred regularly in this division until 1937, when Luton were promoted. A Southern Professional Floodlit Cup meeting in 1956–57 was won 4–3 by Luton at Kenilworth Road, and was the only meeting until Luton dropped back to the Third Division for 1963–64. Luton were nearly relegated again, but in the last home game of the season, against Watford, Luton won 2–1 to both ensure survival and deny Watford promotion. Luton were relegated to the Fourth Division a year later, with Watford winning both matches held over a two-day period at Christmas. The game at Kenilworth Road finished 4–2 to Watford, and two days later Watford won 2–0 at Vicarage Road. Luton were not promoted again until 1967–68, so there were no matches until then.

Growth in prominence

The 1968–69 season saw Watford promoted as champions of the Third Division, having led the division for almost the entire season. This led to the crowd violence associated with the fixture growing in prominence, and Watford won the first league clash with Luton that season 1–0 at Vicarage Road. The return match at Kenilworth Road was originally intended to take place on Boxing Day, but was abandoned due to fog with the game tied at 1–1. The game was eventually played after several postponements on 30 April 1969, by which time Watford had already been promoted as champions. The match was a bloodbath, and three players were sent off – two from Luton, one from Watford – as Luton won 2–1. After the game came incidents between the fans in St Albans, a town between Luton and Watford home to fans of both sides. Luton were promoted to the Second Division a year later to keep the fixture going. However, Watford's relegation in 1971–72 ended it once more.

The sides didn't meet again until 1979–80, when Watford were promoted back to the second tier. In 1981–82 Luton won the Second Division, with Watford coming second – both teams were promoted to the top flight. In their first season in Division One Watford fared significantly better than Luton, and finished Runners-Up to Champions Liverpool (and so qualified for European football in the UEFA Cup for the following season), beating Luton 5–2 at Vicarage Road along the way. Luton, on the other hand, only avoided relegation in the last minute of the last match of the season. The match at Kenilworth Road on 28 April 1984 intensified the rivalry even further, as despite Watford's 2–1 victory, captain Wilf Rostron was sent off after a series of goading tackles from Luton players; meaning that he would miss the 1984 FA Cup Final. Despite being favourites on the day, Watford lost 2–0 to Everton, and even to this day most Watford supporters blame their loss on the absence of Rostron, and therefore on Luton.

The fixture continued until 1987–88, when Watford were relegated. Luton were relegated to the second tier in 1991–92, and the fixture continued – the two teams were even relegated together in 1995–96. In 1997–98, Watford finished as Champions of the third-tier Second Division and won 4–0 at Kenilworth Road along the way – all four goals came within the first 32 minutes. The match was marred by yet more crowd trouble as Luton fans tried to prevent Watford fans leaving the ground and small pockets of running battles occurred towards the railway station. As a result, the police took no chances for the return fixture at Vicarage Road: a large police presence ensured no return of the October violence. The game ended in a 1–1 draw. With Watford's promotion at the end of that season, the fixture was over once more.

The 21st century

A League Cup meeting at Vicarage Road on 10 September 2002 was marred by hooliganism (much of which was blamed on totally inept preparation by the police, who were warned in advance of the match that there would be trouble), with fighting in Watford town centre, railway station and approaches to the football ground before the match. Once in the ground but before the game, Luton fans invaded the pitch several times and this led to the kick-off being delayed by a quarter of an hour. A minute's silence, intended to mark the first anniversary of the 11 September attacks, was also abandoned. When the match finally got under way, Luton went on to win 2–1. After the game prosecutions were brought against 29 supporters; 25 from Luton – some of whom were banned from all football grounds for life – and four from Watford.

The two clubs were briefly back in the same division when Luton won League One and promotion into the Championship for a renewal of the rivalry during the 2005–06 season. This time the Police in Luton and in Watford took no chances of a repeat of the 2002 trouble. Watford won 2–1 at Kenilworth Road on 2 January 2006, and the return fixture was a 1–1 draw at Vicarage Road on 9 April. Watford ended the season with promotion to the Premier League, while Luton finished 10th. Although Watford were relegated back to the second-tier Football League Championship at the end of the 2006–07 season, Luton were concurrently relegated straight back to the third tier. A Further relegation followed for Luton in the 2007–08 season to the fourth tier; and yet another relegation in 2008–09 season (this time outside of the Football League altogether) to the Conference Premier. This was largely due to docked points and financial mismanagement.

Following Watford's promotion to the Premier League at the end of the 2014–15 season, and their subsequent ability to stay there, the two clubs financial differences could not be more starkly demonstrated. At the end of the 2021–22 season Watford's turnover was in the region of £290m, with the club ranked the 29th richest football club in the world. Luton, by comparison have a tiny turnover which means that any future upward momentum will be severely restricted. The contrast can also be seen in the two club's respective stadia: Vicarage Road, Watford has had massive infrastructure spending put into it in the last ten years, resulting in a current capacity of 23,700 (rising to 30,900 by the 2023–24 season, while Kenilworth Road, Luton has a capacity of just 9,250. Luton were hoping to move to a new stadium closer to the town centre on what has become known as the 'Power Court Stadium' site in time for the 2023–24 season; but, as of the end of the 2021–22 season no plans to break ground have been put forward. 

At of the end of the 2019–20 season, Luton had not won a league match against Watford for more than 26 years (since 17 September 1994, nine matches – three Watford wins and six draws), or a competitive match of any kind against Watford for more than 18 years (since 10 September 2002, three matches – two Watford wins and one draw). Watford have been the higher ranked team at the end of every season since 1997 (and for 30 out of the last 31 seasons, with only 1996–97 seeing Luton finish higher in the league than Watford).

The league rivalry between the two clubs restarted in the 2020–21 season for the first time in 16 seasons after Luton battled to remain in the Championship, and Watford were relegated from the Premier League, both on the last days of their respective seasons. However, fans could not watch the matches due to the Covid-19 pandemic. Watford won the first game between the rivals 1–0 at Vicarage Road on Saturday, 26 September. The goal came from João Pedro in the 35th minute, after Luton had missed a great chance to go ahead through James Collins who hit the crossbar from two feet. The scoreline flattered Luton, who did not have a shot on target in the match and would have lost by a larger margin if not for excellent saves from their goalkeeper Sluga. In the reverse fixture at Kenilworth Road on 17 April 2021, Luton deservedly won the game 1–0 with a penalty from James Collins in the 78th minutes enough to seal the game and, although they totally dominated the game with Watford not having a single shot on target throughout the game, just like the first match at Vicarage Road in September the home side were unable to capitalise further. The spoils on the pitch for the season were therefore shared, but with Watford's promotion back to the Premier League for season 2021–22 confirmed just days later, the rivalry was once again put on hold.

Watford were relegated from the Premier League in season 2021–22; while Luton had their best EFL season in decades finishing 6th and qualifying for the Play-Offs where they lost 1-2 over two legs against Huddersfield Town. For the 2022–23 Championship season then, the rivalry was resumed. The first game was played at Vicarage Road on Sunday, 23 October 2022 with Watford winning easily 4-0 and equalling their highest ever win over Luton. Goals from Keinan Davis (3), William Troost-Ekong (45), João Pedro (57) and Ismaïla Sarr (79) wrapped up the three points; Luton's poor day was confounded further in the 82nd minutes when Gabriel Osho's wild late challenge on Ken Sema saw him get a straight red card. It was the first time supporters of either club had been able to attend a match in 16 years, with the crowd totaling 19,282. A huge policing presence kept the rival supporters apart, and not one arrest was made. The next meeting will be at Kenilworth Road on 1 April 2023.

Statistics 

Up to and including 23 October 2022, when Watford won 4–0 in a league match, there have been 120 competitive first–class meetings between the two teams since the first meeting in 1898.

Head-to-head record by competition

Honours and achievements compared

All-time results 

Competitive matches only.

Luton Town at home 
Luton Town result given first.

A  Southern Professional Floodlit Cup

Watford at home 
Watford result given first.

The Rigby-Taylor Cup
The Rigby-Taylor Cup was a competition played between 1953 and 1962 in order to give "the friendly rivalry between Luton Town and Watford an organised and competitive basis". The annual contest came about when floodlights were installed at Watford's Vicarage Road ground in 1953; to mark the occasion, the decision was made to play a match under the new lights against Luton Town, against whom the club had not contested a competitive match since 1937. A home-and-away system was agreed upon, and the first match, billed as the first leg of the "Watford F.C. Invitation Cup", took place on 13 October 1953: a 1–1 draw at Vicarage Road. The competition had been renamed "The Rigby-Taylor Cup" after Watford's chairman, T. Rigby-Taylor, by the time of the second leg on 24 March 1954, at Kenilworth Road; Luton beat Watford 4–1 to win 5–2 on aggregate and thus claim the inaugural title.

After the first season, the two-legged basis was abandoned in favour of a single match at Vicarage Road. The competition was then suspended from 1958 to 1961 due to FA Cup and League engagements. After returning for two seasons, the 1962–63 fixture was abandoned due to harsh weather – the annual match never returned.

Results

There were seven matches played over the course of six editions of the competition: the first (1953–54) was a two-legged competition, while the remaining five consisted of a single match. Of the seven matches, four were Luton victories, two were wins for Watford and one was a draw.

Goalscorers

The competition saw 23 goals scored, 14 for Luton and 9 for Watford; the individual player who scored the most goals was Luton Town's Gordon Turner, who appeared in all seven matches and scored five goals.

Luton Town

Watford

See also
Luton Town F.C.
Watford F.C.

Footnotes

References
Bibliography

Source notes

Watford
Watford F.C.
England football derbies